Methylobacterium brachythecii  is a facultatively methylotrophic bacteria from the genus of Methylobacterium which has been isolated from the moss Brachythecium plumosum in Japan.

References

Further reading

External links
Type strain of Methylobacterium brachythecii at BacDive -  the Bacterial Diversity Metadatabase

Hyphomicrobiales
Bacteria described in 2013